Cow Creek is a watercourse in Sarnia Township, Ontario, that empties into Lake Huron.  The boundaries of the present day watercourse is confused, due to 19th century efforts to drain a wetland, known as Lake Wawanosh.  Lake Wawanosh was drained by Riviere Aux Perches, Perch Creek, a tributary of Cow Creek.  In 1859 a short drainage canal was excavated, that has gone by different names, but which has now widely usurped the name Perch Creek.

The original Cow Creek drained .

References

Rivers of Ontario
Tributaries of Lake Huron